Wraith is a fictional character appearing in American comic books published by Marvel Comics.

Publication history
Wraith first appeared in The Uncanny X-Men #392 and was created by Scott Lobdell and Salvador Larroca.

Fictional character biography
Hector Rendoza was living in Boston when his mutant powers manifested at the age of sixteen. A large crowd formed on Boston Common, many who knew Hector when he was not translucent, intending to kill him. Jean Grey froze the crowd with her telepathic powers and recruits Hector. He is one of many she gathers (including Northstar, Omertà, Dazzler and Sunpyre) to help rescue the X-Men from Genosha, where they are being held by Magneto.

He was shown to be depowered.

Powers and abilities
Wraith can turn either his skin or others' skin translucent.

References

External links
 Wraith (Hector Rendoza) at Marvel Wiki
 

Characters created by Scott Lobdell
Comics characters introduced in 2001
Marvel Comics mutants
Marvel Comics superheroes
X-Men supporting characters